Elections to Tamworth Borough Council were held on 4 May 2000.  One third of the council was up for election and the Labour Party stayed in overall control of the council.

After the election, the composition of the council was:
Labour 16
Conservative 13
Independent 1

Election result

Ward results

References
2000 Tamworth election result
Ward results

2000
2000 English local elections
2000s in Staffordshire